Malajczukia is a genus of truffle-like fungi in the Mesophelliaceae family. The genus contains eight species found in Australia and New Zealand.

The genus name of Malajczukia is in honour of Nicholas Malajczuk, an Australian botanist (Mycology and Lichenology).

The genus was circumscribed by James Martin 'Jim' Trappe and Michael Angelo Castellano in Austral. Syst. Bot. vol.5 (Issue 5) on page 618 in 1992.

References

External links
 

Hysterangiales
Truffles (fungi)
Agaricomycetes genera
Taxa named by James Trappe